The Bảo Đại Thông Bảo (Hán tự: 保大通寶) was a round Copper-alloy coin with a square hole produced by the Nguyễn dynasty under French protection and was the last cash coin produced both in Vietnam and the world, this ended a long series of cast Vietnamese coinage that started with the Thái Bình Hưng Bảo in 970. The cast Bảo Đại Thông Bảo were produced at the Thanh Hóa Mint, while the machine-struck variants were produced in Hanoi by the colonial French government. These coins bear the name of Emperor Bảo Đại who ascended the throne in 1926 but continued the production of the earlier Khải Định Thông Bảo (啓定通寶) that bore his father's name until 1933 when he ordered the production of new coins with his reign name, which was normal as previous Vietnamese emperors also kept producing cash coins with the inscription of their predecessors for a period of time. The cast smaller Bảo Đại Thông Bảo cash coins with blank reverses were only valued at  piastre.

In 1932 it was reported by L'Éveil économique de l'Indochine ("The Economic Awakening of Indochina") that cash coins were increasingly becoming scarce in Annam and Tonkin, the L'Éveil économique de l'Indochine advised the government of the Nguyễn dynasty to start producing zinc Bảo Đại Thông Bảo cash coins to counter the scarcity of low denomination currencies, at this time zinc cash coins were still circulating in Annam while very few of them were left in Tonkin. During this period people were often unwilling to spend money because of the monetary scarcity of the time, economic policy advisors predicted that producing more cash coins would lower the cost of living for the population of the Nguyễn dynasty. 

On 29 September 1939 the Hanoian newspaper l'Effort Indochinois reported that the governments of French Indochina and the Nguyễn dynasty pursued a policy called an muoi, which sought to stabilise the exchange rate between cash coins and the piastre at 360:1. During this period there was a market liquidity crisis worsened by the hoarding of low denomination cash coins by the general populace causing massive deflation of cash coins. Despite starting the an muoi policy in 1937, by 1939 the exchange rate between the piastre and cash coins was at 5 strings per piastre while in some rural areas the price of the piastre went down as much as 3 strings per piastre. The deflation of cash coins proved to be very detrimental to the economy and local trade. 

The reason why these exchange rates were unstable was because cash coins remained independent of the piastre, despite their fixed exchange rates. Machine-struck cash coins tended to circulate more in Tonkin, while cast cash coins circulated more in rural Annam.

The Bảo Đại Thông Bảo were probably cast into 1941 or 1942 and the production was stopped because the occupying Japanese forces wanted the copper and were acquiring all of the cash coins they could find and stockpiling them in Haiphong for shipment to Japan for the production of war materials.

Cash coins would continue to circulate officially in the Democratic Republic of Vietnam until 1948 with an official exchange rate set of 20 cash coins for 1 đồng.

Machine-struck Bảo Đại Thông Bảo cash coins 

The French simultaneously began minting brass machine-struck cash coins in Hanoi, with the same inscription as the cast Bảo Đại Thông Bảo cash coins, with production officially starting in June 1933. These machine-struck cash coins weighed 1.36 grams and had an official exchange rate of  piastre, but were probably only valued at  piastre. 

These coins were minted at the Hanoi Mint (operated by the Banque de l'Indochine) because the French had cut the funding for producing cast cash coins at the Thanh Hòa Mint which meant that the Protectorate of Annam wasn't producing enough cast cash coins to satisfy the demands of the Vietnamese markets for these low value coins for every day exchange. The machine-struck Bảo Đại Thông Bảo cash coins were designed by René Mercier. 

The French authorities purely produced these coins for market liquidity and the French colonial authorities did not accept these coins for any payment to the government such as taxes or levies. While the machine-struck cash coins were successful in Tonkin, they were less welcomed by the rural Annamite population who preferred the cast variant and even millennium old cast cash coins from "the good old days" over the modernised cash coins. The reluctance to accept the machine-struck cash coins in rural Annam contributed to the deflation that cash coins were experiencing there. 

There were two variants of this cash coins where one had a large version of the Chinese "大" (Đại) while the other had a smaller "大". After the Japanese had taken over the country, they forced the production of Bảo Đại Thông Bảo cash coins to stop because they were commandeering all copper in Vietnam. The Japanese created new sapèque-like coins that were made from zinc in Hanoi and by the Japan Mint in Osaka to replace these coins as the copper was being used for the production of Japanese weaponry and other military equipment, though the coins from Osaka didn't make it to the Vietnamese market as the shipping of war supplies was deemed more important by the Japanese government.

There were a total of 98,000,000 machine-struck Bảo Đại Thông Bảo sapèques produced.

See also 

 Cash (Chinese coin)
 Kaiyuan Tongbao
 Tự Đức Thông Bảo
 Tự Đức Bảo Sao

References 

 
 

 

Currencies of Vietnam
Modern obsolete currencies
Economic history of Vietnam
Cash coins by inscription